Kevin Pearson may refer to:

 Kevin Pearson (politician) (born 1959), Republican member of the Louisiana House of Representatives
 Kevin Pearson (bishop), Scottish bishop
 Kevin Pearson, fictional character on NBC's This Is Us TV series
 K. F. Pearson (Kevin Francis Pearson), Australian poet, secretary of the South Australian Poets' Union in the 1970s–1980s